Robert "Benny" Young is a Scottish film, television and stage actor.

In 2009, Young toured with the National Theatre of Scotland production Be Near Me.

In 2013 Young appeared in the West End production of The Resistible Rise of Arturo Ui at the Duchess Theatre.

Young appeared in the Edinburgh International Festival 2018 in the production of David Greig's Midsummer.

In 2018 Young played Sir Simon Fraser in the Netflix original film Outlaw King, which premiered at the Toronto International Film Festival on 6 September 2018.

Filmography

References

External links 

Living people
Scottish male film actors
Scottish male television actors
Scottish male stage actors
Male actors from Glasgow
Year of birth missing (living people)